Oncideres etiolata is a species of beetle in the family Cerambycidae. It was described by Dillon and Dillon in 1946. It is known from Brazil.

References

etiolata
Beetles described in 1946